Burnupena catarrhacta, common name the flame-patterned burnupena, is a species of sea snail, a marine gastropod mollusk in the family Buccinidae, the true whelks.

Description
The length of the shell varies between 25 mm and 50 mm.

The ovate shell is elongated and subturrited. The external surface is of a bluish ash color, marked with very fine, close striae.  It is also ornamented with longitudinal undulated bands or flames, formed by lines more or less approximated. The epidermis is greenish. The slightly pointed spire is composed of six whorls, which are slightly convex, and united by a pretty delicate regular suture. The aperture is oblong ovate and effuse towards the base. The outer lip is smooth and white, marked interiorly, at a short distance from the edge, with sixteen or eighteen transverse striae of a reddish brown. The columella is slightly arched and whitish.

Distribution
This marine species occurs off the West Coast of South Africa.

References

External links
 Branch, G.M. et al. (2002). Two Oceans. 5th impression. David Philip, Cate Town & Johannesburg
 

Buccinidae
Gastropods described in 1791
Taxa named by Johann Friedrich Gmelin